Pier 5, Havana is a 1959 American Neo-noir, action, adventure, mystery, thriller crime film directed by Edward L. Cahn starring Cameron Mitchell and Allison Hayes.

Plot
Steve Daggett (Cameron Mitchell) fights to protect Fidel Castro from dangerous pro-Batista counterrevolutionaries. Steve comes to Cuba to find his friend Hank Miller (Logan Field) who has been missing for a while. It turns out that he has been captured by Fernando (Eduardo Noriega), the leader of the pro-Batista forces, who needs Hank to convert their airplanes into bombers. Steve's former girlfriend Monica (Allison Hayes) is now Mrs. Hank Miller.

'Pier 5, Havana' was filmed in the Los Angeles area just after the Cuban Revolution. The Errol Flynn semi-documentary Cuban Rebel Girls and the black comedy Our Man in Havana were shot on location on the island in the same post-revolution period.

Cast
 Cameron Mitchell as Steve Daggett
 Allison Hayes as Monica Gray
 Eduardo Noriega as Fernando Ricardo
 Michael Granger as Police Lt. Garcia
 Logan Field as Hank Miller
 Nestor Paiva as Juan Lopez
 Otto Waldis as Gustave Schluss
 Paul Fierro as Police sergeant

References

External links 
 
 
 
 

Films directed by Edward L. Cahn
1959 films
Films about the Cuban Revolution
Films produced by Edward Small
Cuban Revolution in fiction
Films scored by Paul Sawtell
1950s English-language films